Love Project is a Canadian drama film, directed by Carole Laure and released in 2014. An ensemble drama, the film focuses on the professional and personal lives of a group of young theatre professionals who are working to produce a multimedia stage play.

Its cast includes Magalie Lépine-Blondeau, Benoît McGinnis, Natacha Filiatrault, Éric Robidoux, Céline Bonnier, Tomas Furey, Victoria Diamond, Charles-William Ross, Alice Morel-Michaud, Pascale Bussières, Roger La Rue, Benoît Lachambre, Louise Bombardier and Louise Latraverse.

The film premiered on October 17, 2014, at the Festival du nouveau cinéma.

Lewis Furey received a Canadian Screen Award nomination for Best Original Song at the 3rd Canadian Screen Awards in 2015, for the song "Road to Rainbow's End". Hairstylist Ghislaine Sant received a Jutra Award nomination for Best Hair at the 17th Jutra Awards.

References

External links

2014 films
2014 drama films
Canadian drama films
Films set in Montreal
Films shot in Montreal
French-language Canadian films
2010s Canadian films